Jang Seo-hee (born January 5, 1972) is a South Korean actress. She has starred in numerous television dramas, including Miss Mermaid (2002) and Temptation of Wife (2008), which were both extremely successful in the ratings and earned Jang the highest acting prize from the  MBC Drama Awards and SBS Drama Awards. In a 2007 Chinese survey of the most influential Korean actors, Jang was the highest ranking actress and placed seventh overall.

Jang made her entertainment debut when she won in a 1981 children's beauty pageant, and began her acting career as a child actress and model. She was later appointed as goodwill ambassador for the 2009 Gwangju Design Biennale.

Filmography

Films

Television series

Filipino Television

Awards

Listicles

References

External links

 
 
 
 

South Korean television actresses
South Korean film actresses
South Korean child actresses
Actresses from Seoul
1972 births
Living people
Kyung Hee Cyber University alumni
South Korean Buddhists